Henderson Lake or Lake Henderson may refer to:
 Henderson Lake (New York), a lake in the Adirondacks which is considered to be the official source and start of the Hudson River
 Henderson Lake (British Columbia), the former name of Hucuktlis Lake, a lake on Vancouver Island that drains south into head of Uchucklesit Inlet on the north side of lower Alberni Inlet
 Lake Henderson (New Zealand), a lake in the Tasman District